Deva (Sanskrit:) means "shiny", "exalted", "heavenly being", "divine being", "anything of excellence", and is also one of the Sanskrit terms used to indicate a deity in Hinduism. Deva is a masculine term; the feminine equivalent is Devi.

In the earliest Vedic literature, all supernatural beings are called Devas and Asuras. The concepts and legends evolved in ancient Indian literature, and by the late Vedic period, benevolent supernatural beings are referred to as Deva-Asuras. In post-Vedic Hindu texts, such as the Puranas and the Itihasas of Hinduism, the Devas represent the good, and the Asuras the bad. In some medieval works of Indian literature, Devas are also referred to as Suras and contrasted with their equally powerful but malevolent half-brothers, referred to as the Asuras.

Devas, along with Asuras, Yakshas (nature spirits), and Rakshasas (ghoulish ogres/demons), are part of Indian mythology, and Devas feature in many cosmological theories in Hinduism.

Etymology
Deva is a Sanskrit word found in Vedic literature of 2nd millennium BCE. Sir Monier Monier-Williams translates it as "heavenly, divine, terrestrial things of high excellence, exalted, shining ones". The concept also is used to refer to deity.

The Sanskrit deva-  derives from Indo-Iranian *daiv- which in turn descends from the Proto-Indo-European word, *deiwo-, originally an adjective meaning "celestial" or "shining", which is a (not synchronic Sanskrit) vrddhi derivative from *diw, zero-grade of the root *dyew- meaning "to shine", especially as the day-lit sky. The feminine form of *deiwos is *deiwih2, which descends into Indic languages as devi, in that context meaning "female deity". Also deriving from *deiwos, and thus cognates of deva, are "Zeys/Ζεύς" - "Dias/Δίας", the Greek father of the gods, Lithuanian Dievas (Latvian Dievs, Prussian Deiwas), Germanic Tiwaz (seen in English "Tuesday") and the related Old Norse Tivar (gods),  and Latin Deus "god" and divus "divine", from which the English words "divine" and "deity" are derived. It is related to *Dyeus which while from the same root, may originally have referred to the "heavenly shining father", and hence to "Father Sky", the chief God of the Indo-European pantheon, continued in Sanskrit Dyaus. The abode of the Devas is Dyuloka.

According to Douglas Harper, the etymological roots of Deva mean "a shining one," from *div- "to shine," and it is cognate with Greek dios "divine" and Zeus, and Latin deus "god" (Old Latin deivos). The word "Deva" shares similarities with Persian Daeva.

Deva is masculine; the related feminine equivalent is devi. Etymologically, Devi is cognate with Latin dea. When capitalized, Devi or Mata refers to a divine mother goddess in Hinduism. Deva is also referred to as Devatā, and Devi as Devika.

The word Deva is also a proper name or part of a name in Indian culture, where it refers to "one who wishes to excel, overcome" or the "seeker of, master of or a best among".

Vedic literature

Samhitas and Brahmanas

The Samhitas, which are the oldest layer of text in Vedas enumerate 33 devas, either 11 each for the three worlds, or as 12 Adityas, 11 Rudras, 8 Vasus and 2 Asvins in the Brahmanas layer of Vedic texts. The Rigveda states in hymn 1.139.11,

Some devas represent the forces of nature and some represent moral values (such as the Adityas, Varuna, and Mitra), each symbolizing the epitome of a specialized knowledge, creative energy, exalted and magical powers (Siddhis). The most referred to Devas in the Rig Veda are Indra, Agni (fire) and Soma, with "fire deity" called the friend of all humanity, it and Soma being the two celebrated in a yajna fire ritual that marks major Hindu ceremonies. Savitr, Vishnu, Rudra (later given the exclusive epithet of Shiva), and Prajapati (later Brahma) are gods and hence Devas. Parvati (power and love) and Durga (victory) are some Devis or goddesses. Many of the deities taken together are worshiped as the Vishvedevas.

Important Devas
Brahma the deity of creation
Vishnu the deity of preservation
Shiva the deity of destruction and time; associated with fertility and regeneration
Ganesha the deity of new beginnings, wisdom, and luck
Hanuman the deity associateded to courage, reverence and strength/avatar of Shiva
Kartikeya the deity of victory and war
Vishwakarma the deity of architecture
Dhanvantari the deity of doctors and Ayurveda/avatar of Vishnu
Dyaus the deity of the  aether (or sky)
Vayu the deity of air, wind and breath
Varuna the deity of water and rain
Agni the deity of fire
Yama the deity of death and justice
Samudra the deity of the seas/form of Varuna
Kubera the deity of opulence and wealth
Kamadeva the deity of love
Indra the king of deities and deity of weather, storms and sky
Ashwini Kumara the deity of health and medicine
Surya the deity of the sun, light and day
Chandra the deity of the moon and night
Mangala the deity of Mars and Aggression
Budha the deity of Mercury and Nature
Brihaspati  the deity of Jupiter and teacher of the  Devas
Shukra the deity of Venus and worship (bhakti) and teacher of the Asuras
Shani the deity of Saturn and deeds (karma)

Henotheism
In Vedic literature, Deva is not a monotheistic God; rather a "supernatural, divine" concept manifesting in various ideas and knowledge, in a form that combines excellence in some aspects, wrestling with weakness and questions in other aspects, heroic in their outlook and actions, yet tied up with emotions and desires.

Max Muller states that the Vedic hymns are remarkable in calling every one of the different devas as "the only one, the supreme, the greatest". Muller concluded that the Vedic ideas about devas are best understood neither as polytheism nor as monotheism, but as henotheism where gods are equivalent, different perspectives, different aspects of reverence and spirituality, unified by principles of Ṛta and Dharma.

Characteristics of Devas in the Vedic literature
Ananda Coomaraswamy states that Devas and Asuras in the Vedic lore are similar to the Olympian gods and Titans of Greek mythology. Both are powerful but have different orientations and inclinations, with the Devas representing the powers of Light and the Asuras representing the powers of Darkness in Hindu mythology. According to Coomaraswamy's interpretation of Devas and Asuras, both these natures exist in each human being, both the tyrant and the angel. The best and the worst within each person struggles before choices and one's own nature, and the Hindu formulation of Devas and Asuras is an eternal dance between these within each person.

All-powerful beings, good or evil, are called Devas and Asuras in the oldest layer of Vedic texts. A much-studied hymn of the Rigveda states Devav asura (Asuras who have become Devas), and contrasts it with Asura adevah (Asuras who are not Devas). They are born from the same father, Prajapati, the primordial progenitor; his sons are envisioned as the Asuras and Devas. They all share the same residence (Loka), eat together the same food and drinks (Soma), and have innate potential, knowledge and special powers in Hindu mythology; the only thing that distinguishes "Asuras who become Devas" from "Asuras who remain Asuras" is intent, action and choices they make in their mythic lives.

Upanishads

The oldest Upanishads mention Devas, and their struggle with the Asuras. The Kaushitaki Upanishad, for example, in Book 4 states that "Indra was weaker than the Asuras when he did not know his own Atman (soul, self). Once Indra had self-knowledge, he became independent, sovereign and victorious over the Asuras"; similarly, states Kaushitaki Upanishad, "the man who knows his inner self gains independence, sovereignty and is unaffected by all evil".

Chandogya Upanishad, in chapter 1.2, describes the battle between Devas and Asuras on various sensory powers. This battle between good and evil fails to produce a victor and simply manifests itself in the perceived universe, as good or evil sights witnessed by beings, as good or evil words shared between people, as good or evil smells of nature, as good or evil feelings experienced, as good or evil thoughts within each person. Finally, the Deva-Asura battle targets the soul, where Asuras fail and Devas succeed, because soul-force is serene and inherently good, asserts Chandogya Upanishad.

Chapter 3.5.2 of the Brihadaranyaka Upanishad describes Devas, Men, and Asuras as sons of Prajapati, the primordial father. Each asks for a lesson on ethics. Prajapati tells the Devas to observe the virtue of temperance (self-restraint, Dama), the Men to observe the virtue of charity (Dana), and Asuras to observe the virtue of compassion (Daya). At the end of the chapter, the Upanishad declares that these are three cardinal virtues that should always be observed by all Devas, Men and Asuras.

Medieval era Indian scholars, in their Bhasya (review and commentaries) on the Upanishads, stated that the discussion of Devas and Asuras in the Upanishads is symbolic, and it represents the good and evil that resides and struggles within each human being. Adi Shankara, for example, in his commentary on Brihadaranyaka Upanishad asserted that Devas represent the human seeking for the sacred and spiritual, while the Asuras represent the human seeking for the worldly excesses. Edelmann and other modern era scholars also state that the Devas versus Asuras discussion in Upanishads is a form of symbolism.

In the later primary Upanishadic texts, Devas and Asuras discuss and act to seek knowledge, for different purposes. In one case, for example, they go to Prajāpati, their father, to understand what is Self (Atman, soul) and how to realize it. The first answer that Prajāpati gives is simplistic, which the Asuras accept and leave with, but the Devas led by Indra do not accept and question because Indra finds that he hasn't grasped its full significance and the given answer has inconsistencies. Edelmann states that this symbolism embedded in the Upanishads is a reminder that one must struggle with presented ideas, learning is a process, and Deva nature emerges with effort.

Puranas and Itihasas
In the Puranas and the Itihasas with the embedded Bhagavad Gita, the Devas represent the good, and the Asuras the bad. According to the Bhagavad Gita (16.6-16.7), all beings in the universe have both the divine qualities (daivi sampad) and the demonic qualities (asuri sampad) within each. The sixteenth chapter of the Bhagavad Gita states that pure god-like saints are rare and pure demon-like evil are rare among human beings, and the bulk of humanity is multi-charactered with a few or many faults. According to Jeaneane Fowler, the Gita states that desires, aversions, greed, needs, emotions in various forms "are facets of ordinary lives", and it is only when they turn to lust, hate, cravings, arrogance, conceit, anger, harshness, hypocrisy, violence, cruelty and such negativity- and destruction-inclined that natural human inclinations metamorphose into something demonic (Asura).

Everyone starts as an Asura in Hindu mythology, born of the same father. "Asuras who remain Asura" share the character of powerful beings obsessed with their craving for more power, more wealth, ego, anger, unprincipled nature, force and violence. The "Asuras who become Devas" in contrast are driven by an inner voice, seek understanding and meaning, prefer moderation, principled behavior, morals, knowledge, and harmony. The hostility between the two is the source of extensive legends and tales in the Puranic and the Epic literature of Hinduism; however, many texts discuss their hostility in neutral terms and without explicit condemnation. Some of these tales are the basis for myths behind major Hindu festivals, such as the story of Asura Ravana and Deva Rama in the Ramayana and the legend of Asura Hiranyakashipu and Deva Vishnu as Narasimha, the latter celebrated with the Hindu spring festival of Holika and Holi.

Bhagavata Purana
In Bhagavata Purana, Brahma had ten sons: Marichi, Atri, Angira, Pulastya, Pulaha, Kratu, Vasistha, Daksa, Narada. Marici had a son called Kasyapa. Kasyapa had thirteen wives: Aditi, Diti, Danu, Kadru etc. The sons of Aditi are called Adityas, the sons of Diti are called Daityas, and the sons of Danu are called Danavas. Bṛhaspati (Jupiter, son of Angiras) is a guru of devas (vedic gods). Shukracharya (Venus, son of Bhrigu) is a guru of asuras (vedic demons) or/and Danavas.

Symbolism
Edelmann states that the dichotomies present in the Puranas literature of Hinduism are symbolism for spiritual concepts. For example, god Indra (a Deva) and the antigod Virocana (an Asura) question a sage for insights into the knowledge of the self. Virocana leaves with the first given answer, believing now he can use the knowledge as a weapon. In contrast, Indra keeps pressing the sage, churning the ideas, and learning about means to inner happiness and power. Edelmann suggests that the Deva-Asura dichotomies in Hindu mythology may be seen as "narrative depictions of tendencies within our selves".

The god (Deva) and antigod (Asura), states Edelmann, are also symbolically the contradictory forces that motivate each individual and people, and thus Deva-Asura dichotomy is a spiritual concept rather than mere genealogical category or species of being. In the Bhāgavata Purana, saints and gods are born in families of Asuras, such as Mahabali and Prahlada, conveying the symbolism that motivations, beliefs, and actions rather than one's birth and family circumstances define whether one is Deva-like or Asura-like.

Classical Hinduism

In Hinduism, Devas are celestial beings associated with various aspects of the cosmos. 
Devas such as Brahma, Vishnu, and Shiva, form the Hindu trinity known as the Trimurthi and preside over the functioning of the cosmos and the evolution of creation.

Lesser devas may control the forces of nature, such as Vayu, the Lord of the wind, Varuna the Lord of water, and Agni, the lord of fire.

Hinduism also has many other lesser celestial beings, such as the married Gandharvas (male celestial musicians) and Apsaras (female celestial dancers).

Sangam literature

Sangam literature of Tamil (300BC-300CE) describes the offerings for devas. In Silapathikaram one of the five epics of Tamil by Ilango Adigal saying the offering for Four kind of devas.

See also

 Vishvadevas
 Ishvara
 Bhagavan
 God and gender in Hinduism
 Hindu deities
 Deva (Buddhism)
 Jangam
 Divinity
 Devata
 Daeva
 Diwata

Notes

References

Further reading 
 The Basic Concept of Vedic Religion FBJ Kuiper (1975), History of Religions, Vol. 15, No. 2, pages 107–120 (on roots of Devas and Asuras)
 The Proto-Indoaryans T Burrow (1973), Journal of the Royal Asiatic Society of Great Britain & Ireland, Vol. 105, Issue 2, pages 123–140 (on roots of Devas and Asuras in Indo-Iranian versus Indo-European history)
 Indo-European Deities and the Rigveda ND Kazanas (2001), The Journal of Indo-European Studies, Vol. 29, No. 3 & 4
 The Vedic Gods of Japan S Kak (2004), Brahmavidyā: The Adyar Library Bulletin (on the spread of Vedic Devas such as Indra, Agni, Vayu outside India)
 On Translation: Māyā, Deva, Tapas Ananda Coomaraswamy, Isis, Vol. 19, No. 1, pages 74–91 (on alternate meanings of Devas)
 Ritual, Knowledge, and Being: Initiation and Veda Study in Ancient India Brian K. Smith (1986), Numen, Vol. 33, Fasc. 1, pages 65–89 (on the role of knowledge in empowering the Deva nature in man)

Hindu gods
Names of God in Hinduism
Rigvedic deities
Non-human races in Hindu mythology